Maxime Sauvé (born January 30, 1990) is a French-born Canadian former professional ice hockey player. He was selected by the Boston Bruins in the 2nd round (47th overall) of the 2008 NHL Entry Draft and played one game in the National Hockey League for the Bruins during the 2011–12 season.

Early life
Sauvé was born in Tours, France, but grew up in Boisbriand, Quebec. As a youth, he played in the 2003 Quebec International Pee-Wee Hockey Tournament with a minor ice hockey team from the Mille-Îles area of Laval, Quebec.

Sauve is the son of former NHL player Jean-François Sauvé, nephew of Bob Sauve and the cousin of Philippe Sauvé.

Playing career
Sauvé played major junior hockey in the Quebec Major Junior Hockey League (QMJHL) from 2006–07 to 2009–10, collecting 76 goals and 116 assists for 192 points in 219 games.

On March 11, 2012, Sauvé made his NHL debut skating seven shifts (3:43 total ice time) with the Boston Bruins in a 5-2 away game loss to the Pittsburgh Penguins. Sauvé became the fifth France born player to play a game in the NHL along with Antoine Roussel, Cristobal Huet, Philippe Bozon and Stéphane Da Costa.

On April 3, 2013, Sauvé was traded by the Bruins to the Chicago Blackhawks in exchange for forward Rob Flick.

After spending the duration of the 2013–14 season on an AHL contract with the Norfolk Admirals, Sauvé opted to pursue a career abroad in signing a one-year contract with German club, Kölner Haie of the Deutsche Eishockey Liga on October 1, 2014. Sauve struggled in his first season abroad, suffering injury he appeared in just 27 games and contributed with 9 points in the 2014–15 campaign. He was not offered a new contract to remain with the Sharks.

In the 2015–16 season, Sauve earned a new contract in the AHL and signed a one-year-contract with the Hershey Bears. He was assigned to ECHL affiliate, the South Carolina Stingrays, appearing in just 10 games for the year.

Career statistics

Regular season and playoffs

International

References

External links

1990 births
Living people
Boston Bruins draft picks
Boston Bruins players
Boxers de Bordeaux players
Canadian ice hockey centres
French ice hockey players
Ice hockey people from Quebec
Kölner Haie players
Norfolk Admirals players
People from Boisbriand
Sportspeople from Tours, France
Providence Bruins players
Quebec Remparts players
Rockford IceHogs (AHL) players
South Carolina Stingrays players
Val-d'Or Foreurs players
Canadian expatriate ice hockey players in Germany
French emigrants to Canada